The grey-bellied squirrel (Callosciurus caniceps) is a species of rodent in the family Sciuridae. It is found in forests, plantations and gardens in Peninsular Malaysia, Thailand, southern Myanmar, southern China (Yunnan) and possibly western Laos. It has been introduced in the Ryukyu Islands in Japan. As suggested by its name, its belly is usually grey, though sometimes reddish on the sides. Depending on subspecies and season, the upperparts are grey, yellowish-olive or reddish.

Weight 

Rudd (1965) gave the weights of 2 adult males trapped in Malaysia as follow : 247.7 and 251.5 g.

References

Ecology Asia page with photos and description.

External links
 Photo gallery showing some of the variations of the grey-bellied squirrel.

Callosciurus
Rodents of Malaysia
Rodents of Thailand
Rodents of Myanmar
Rodents of China
Mammals of Laos
Mammals described in 1842
Taxonomy articles created by Polbot